Masashi Kudo is a Japanese animator. He is best known for his work on Bleach, the anime series based on the manga of the same name.

Kudo was responsible for the design of some minor characters that do not appear in the manga and from the selection of colours for characters which have not been illustrated; this last task is also made in collaboration with the series' creator.

He has also made collaborations on several OVAs and Original net animations, mostly as a character designer or key animator.

Works

Animated series 

 Bleach (2004-2012) – Character Design
 Today's Asuka Show (2012-2013) – Director & Character Design
 Hayate the Combat Butler: Can't Take My Eyes Off You (2012) – Director & Character Design
 Maoyu (2013) – Character Design
 Hayate the Combat Butler: Cuties (2013) – Director & Character Design
 Survival Game Club! (2014) – Character Design & Chief Animation Director
 Re-Kan! (2015) – Director
 Chain Chronicle: The Light of Haecceitas (2017) – Director & Character Design
 Sanrio Boys (2018) – Director
 Tower of God (2020) – Character Design
 Bleach: Thousand Year Blood War (2022) – Character Design

Animated films 

 Bleach: Memories of Nobody (2006) – Character Design & Chief Animation Director
 Bleach: The DiamondDust Rebellion (2007) – Character Design
 Bleach: Fade to Black (2008) – Character Design
 Bleach: Hell Verse (2010) – Character Design & Chief Animation Director
 Chain Chronicle: The Light of Haecceitas Part 1 (2016) – Director & Character Design
 Chain Chronicle: The Light of Haecceitas Part 2 (2017) – Director & Character Design
 Chain Chronicle: The Light of Haecceitas Part 3 (2017) – Director & Character Design
 Santa Company: Midsummer Merry Christmas (2021) – Character Design

References

External links
 
 http://www.pierrot.jp

Living people
Manga artists
Japanese animators
Japanese animated film directors
Year of birth missing (living people)